Henry William Barber (5 November 1841 – 10 July 1924) was an English amateur cricketer. He played thirteen first-class matches for Kent County Cricket Club and the Gentlemen of Kent between 1861 and 1864. Barber attended The King's School, Canterbury.

References

External links
 

1841 births
1924 deaths
English cricketers
Kent cricketers
People from Bloomsbury
Cricketers from Greater London
Gentlemen of Kent cricketers